JVG (formerly known as Jare & VilleGalle) is a Finnish rap duo made up of Jare Joakim Brand (born 8 October 1987)  and Ville-Petteri Galle (born 4 October 1987).

Their style is often referred to as sport rap. Both Jare and Ville are passionate athletes and originally became famous for their unique and comical sports-themed songs, where they rapped about ice hockey, soccer, doping, Finnish sportspeople (such as Jari Litmanen and Teemu Selänne), snus and playing NHL video games.

In 2020, during the COVID-19 pandemic, JVG held a virtual reality concert on the first of May in a simulated version of Helsinki, with estimated attendance somewhere from 700,000 to over 1,000,000.

Discography

Albums

Singles

Featured in

VilleGalle was also featured in on:
2008: "Katkerat savut"	by  Hulabaloo (Sirkusteltta album)
2009: "Siivoo suu poika" by Juno (Kettoteippi album)
2009: "Raybanit" by Juno (Kettoteippi album, also featuring ink)
2010: "Kuka on lämmittäny mun uunii?"	by Gasellit (Gasellit EP, also featuring Juno)
2010: "Suomileffas" by Juno (J.K x 2 Tunti terapiaa album)
2010: "Hameen alle" by Matinpoika (Vasta kohta album, also featuring Juno, Okku, Jessica & Linda)
2010: "Marraskuu" by X23 (X23-12X album, also featuring Kassumato)
2011: "Feel Free (Remix)" by Gracias (Gracias EP, also featuring Juno & Paperi T)	
2012: "Hiki" by Gasellit (Kiittämätön album)
2012: "Tytöt (Uusi Fantasia Remix)" by PMMP ("Tytöt" single)
2013: "Syö mun suklaata" by Teflon Brothers (Valkoisten dyynien ratsastajat album)		
2013: "Täs sitä ollaa" by Juno (050187 album, also featuring Matinpoika)
2014: "Flexaa" by Cheek (single)
2015: "Keinutaan" by Antti Tuisku (single)

Other charted songs

Discography: VilleGalle
Singles

Featured in

References

External links
Official website
Facebook

Finnish hip hop groups
Musical groups established in 2009
Hip hop duos
MTV Europe Music Award winners